One-sided may refer to:

 Biased
 One-sided argument, a logical fallacy
 In calculus, one-sided limit, either of the two limits of a function  of a real variable  as  approaches a specified point
 One-sided (algebra)
 One-sided overhand bend, simple method of joining two cords or threads together
 One-sided test, a statistical test

See also
 Unilateralism